MoneySense is a Filipino personal finance magazine published on a bimonthly basis by MoneyTree Publishing Corp.

MoneySense targets middle and upper-middle income readers who want to know about the best ways to earn, save, spend, borrow, invest, and protect their money.

References

External links
 MoneySense (Philippines) Official site

Bi-monthly magazines
Business magazines
Magazines with year of establishment missing
Magazines published in the Philippines